A list of animated feature films that were released in 1970.

See also
 List of animated television series of 1970

References

Feature films
1970
1970-related lists